Skeena is a provincial electoral district for the Legislative Assembly of British Columbia, Canada.  It first appeared in the provincial election of 1924.  It should not be confused with the former federal electoral district of Skeena, which encompassed a larger area.

Demographics

Geography

As of the 2020 provincial election, Skeena comprises the southern portion of the Regional District of Kitimat-Stikine, with the exception of the southern tip of the region which is part of the North Coast electoral district. It is located in western British Columbia, with the northwest bordering Alaska, United States. Communities in the electoral district consist of Terrace and Kitimat.

History 
This electoral district has elected the following Members of Legislative Assembly:

Member of Legislative Assembly 
Its MLA is Ellis Ross, the former Chief Councillor for the Haisla Nation. He was first elected in 2017. He represents the British Columbia Liberal Party. He briefly served as Minister of Natural Gas Development and Minister Responsible for Housing in the Government of Christy Clark.

Election results 

|-
 
|NDP
|Robin Austin
|align="right"|5,865
|align="right"|50.77
|align="right"| +2.47
|align="right"|$68,501

|Conservative
|Michael Brousseau
|align="right"|893
|align="right"|7.73
|align="right"|
|align="right"|$6,594

|- style="background:white;"
! style="text-align:right;" colspan="3"|Total Valid Votes
!align="right"|11,553
!align="right"|100%
|- style="background:white;"
! style="text-align:right;" colspan="3"|Total Rejected Ballots
!align="right"|64
!align="right"|0.7%
|- style="background:white;"
! style="text-align:right;" colspan="3"|Turnout
!align="right"|11,617
!align="right"|55%
|}

|-
 
|NDP
|Robin Austin
|align="right"|6,166
|align="right"|48.12%
|align="right"|
|align="right"|$56,311

|-

|- style="background:white;"
! style="text-align:right;" colspan="3"|Total Valid Votes
!align="right"|12,813
!align="right"|100%
|- style="background:white;"
! style="text-align:right;" colspan="3"|Total Rejected Ballots
!align="right"|89
!align="right"|0.7%
|- style="background:white;"
! style="text-align:right;" colspan="3"|Turnout
!align="right"|12,902
!align="right"|63%
|}

|-

|-
 
|NDP
|Helmut Giesbrecht
|align="right"|2,644
|align="right"|19.91%
|align="right"|
|align="right"|$16,230

|- bgcolor="white"
!align="right" colspan=3|Total Valid Votes
!align="right"|13,281
!align="right"|100.00%
!align="right"|
|- bgcolor="white"
!align="right" colspan=3|Total Rejected Ballots
!align="right"|68
!align="right"|0.51%
!align="right"|
|- bgcolor="white"
!align="right" colspan=3|Turnout
!align="right"|13,349
!align="right"|72.13%
!align="right"|
|}

|-
 
|NDP
|Helmut Giesbrecht
|align="right"|5,353
|align="right"|40.34%
|align="right"|
|align="right"|$29,298
|-

|- bgcolor="white"
!align="right" colspan=3|Total Valid Votes
!align="right"|13,269
!align="right"|100.00%
!align="right"|
|- bgcolor="white"
!align="right" colspan=3|Total Rejected Ballots
!align="right"|93
!align="right"|0.70%
!align="right"|
|- bgcolor="white"
!align="right" colspan=3|Turnout
!align="right"|13,362
!align="right"|70.72%
!align="right"|
|}

|-
 
|NDP
|Helmut Giesbrecht
|align="right"|5,597
|align="right"|46.67%
|align="right"|
|align="right"|$31,137
|-

|- bgcolor="white"
!align="right" colspan=3|Total Valid Votes
!align="right"|11,992
!align="right"|100.00%
!align="right"|
!align="right"|
|- bgcolor="white"
!align="right" colspan=3|Total Rejected Ballots
!align="right"|201
!align="right"|1.65%
!align="right"|
!align="right"|
|- bgcolor="white"
!align="right" colspan=3|Turnout
!align="right"|12,193
!align="right"|72.46%
!align="right"|
!align="right"|
|}

|-

 
|NDP
|Frank Howard
|align="right"|7,101 	
|align="right"|41.79%
|align="right"|
|align="right"|

|Independent
|Sebastian Gordon
|align="right"|793 	
|align="right"|4.66%
|align="right"|
|align="right"|$983
|- bgcolor="white"
!align="right" colspan=3|Total Valid Votes
!align="right"|16,992 
!align="right"|100.00%
!align="right"|
!align="right"|
|- bgcolor="white"
!align="right" colspan=3|Total Rejected Ballots
!align="right"|225
!align="right"|1.65%
!align="right"|
!align="right"|
|- bgcolor="white"
!align="right" colspan=3|Turnout
!align="right"|
!align="right"|%
!align="right"|
!align="right"|
|}

|-
 
|NDP
|Frank Howard
|align="right"|9,682 	
|align="right"|51.12%
|align="right"|
|align="right"|

|Independent
|Lionel Wayne Sears
|align="right"|297 		
|align="right"|1.57%
|align="right"|
|align="right"|
|- bgcolor="white"
!align="right" colspan=3|Total Valid Votes
!align="right"|18,941
!align="right"|100.00%
!align="right"|
!align="right"|
|- bgcolor="white"
!align="right" colspan=3|Total Rejected Ballots
!align="right"|242
!align="right"|1.65%
!align="right"|
!align="right"|
|- bgcolor="white"
!align="right" colspan=3|Turnout
!align="right"|
!align="right"|%
!align="right"|
!align="right"|
|}

|-
 
|NDP
|Frank Howard
|align="right"|7,561 	
|align="right"|50.29%
|align="right"|
|align="right"|

|Independent
|David L. McCreery
|align="right"|197 		
|align="right"|1.31%
|align="right"|
|align="right"|

|Independent
|Arthur David Serry
|align="right"|83 		
|align="right"|0.55%
|align="right"|
|align="right"|
|- bgcolor="white"
!align="right" colspan=3|Total Valid Votes
!align="right"|15,034
!align="right"|100.00%
!align="right"|
!align="right"|
|- bgcolor="white"
!align="right" colspan=3|Total Rejected Ballots
!align="right"|233
!align="right"|1.65%
!align="right"|
!align="right"|
|- bgcolor="white"
!align="right" colspan=3|Turnout
!align="right"|
!align="right"|%
!align="right"|
!align="right"|
|}

|-

 
|NDP
|Hartley Douglas Dent
|align="right"|6,145 	 	
|align="right"|44.77%
|align="right"|
|align="right"|

|Liberal
|Ronald N. Gowe
|align="right"|484 		 	
|align="right"|3.52%
|align="right"|
|align="right"|

|Progressive Conservative
|Victor Charles George Jolliffe
|align="right"|235 	 	
|align="right"|1.71%
|align="right"|
|align="right"|
|- bgcolor="white"
!align="right" colspan=3|Total Valid Votes
!align="right"|13,727
!align="right"|100.00%
!align="right"|
!align="right"|
|- bgcolor="white"
!align="right" colspan=3|Total Rejected Ballots
!align="right"|141
!align="right"|%
!align="right"|
!align="right"|
|- bgcolor="white"
!align="right" colspan=3|Turnout
!align="right"|
!align="right"|%
!align="right"|
!align="right"|
|}

|-
 
|NDP
|Hartley Douglas Dent
|align="right"|5,442 	 	
|align="right"|46.90%
|align="right"|
|align="right"|

|Liberal
|Ian Charles MacDonald
|align="right"|1,441 	 	
|align="right"|12.42%
|align="right"|
|align="right"|

|Progressive Conservative
|Richard William Sargent
|align="right"|1,040 	 	
|align="right"|8.96%
|align="right"|
|align="right"|

|Independent
|Lionel Wayne Sears
|align="right"|76 		
|align="right"|0.65%
|align="right"|
|align="right"|
|- bgcolor="white"
!align="right" colspan=3|Total Valid Votes
!align="right"|11,604 
!align="right"|100.00%
!align="right"|
!align="right"|
|- bgcolor="white"
!align="right" colspan=3|Total Rejected Ballots
!align="right"|206
!align="right"|%
!align="right"|
!align="right"|
|- bgcolor="white"
!align="right" colspan=3|Turnout
!align="right"|
!align="right"|%
!align="right"|
!align="right"|
|}

|-

 
|NDP
|James Harold Robertson
|align="right"|4,059 		
|align="right"|41.20%
|align="right"|
|align="right"|

|Liberal
|Kurt Theodor Kolterhoff
|align="right"|748 	 	 	
|align="right"|7.59%
|align="right"|
|align="right"|
|- bgcolor="white"
!align="right" colspan=3|Total Valid Votes
!align="right"|9,851
!align="right"|100.00%
!align="right"|
!align="right"|
|- bgcolor="white"
!align="right" colspan=3|Total Rejected Ballots
!align="right"|180
!align="right"|%
!align="right"|
!align="right"|
|- bgcolor="white"
!align="right" colspan=3|Turnout
!align="right"|
!align="right"|%
!align="right"|
!align="right"|
|}

|-

 
|NDP
|Ronald Douglas
|align="right"|1,742 	 		
|align="right"|31.68%
|align="right"|
|align="right"|

|Liberal
|William Ivor Donald
|align="right"|711 	 	 	 	
|align="right"|12.93%
|align="right"|
|align="right"|
|- bgcolor="white"
!align="right" colspan=3|Total Valid Votes
!align="right"|5,499
!align="right"|100.00%
!align="right"|
!align="right"|
|- bgcolor="white"
!align="right" colspan=3|Total Rejected Ballots
!align="right"|56
!align="right"|%
!align="right"|
!align="right"|
|- bgcolor="white"
!align="right" colspan=3|Turnout
!align="right"|
!align="right"|%
!align="right"|
!align="right"|
|}

|-

 
|NDP
|Richard Mouat Toynbee
|align="right"|1,975 		
|align="right"|33.48%
|align="right"|
|align="right"|

|Liberal
|William Ivor Donald
|align="right"|961 	 	 	
|align="right"|16.29%
|align="right"|
|align="right"|
|- bgcolor="white"
!align="right" colspan=3|Total Valid Votes
!align="right"|5,899 
!align="right"|100.00%
!align="right"|
!align="right"|
|- bgcolor="white"
!align="right" colspan=3|Total Rejected Ballots
!align="right"|65
!align="right"|%
!align="right"|
!align="right"|
|- bgcolor="white"
!align="right" colspan=3|Turnout
!align="right"|
!align="right"|%
!align="right"|
!align="right"|
|}

|-

 
|Co-operative Commonwealth Fed.
|Monty Alton
|align="right"|2,137 			
|align="right"|37.00%
|align="right"|
|align="right"|

|Liberal
|William Donald Stickney
|align="right"|848 	 	 	 	
|align="right"|14.68%
|align="right"|
|align="right"|

|Conservative
|Guy Ronald Williams
|align="right"|411 	
|align="right"|7.12%
|align="right"|
|align="right"|
|- bgcolor="white"
!align="right" colspan=3|Total Valid Votes
!align="right"|5,775 
!align="right"|100.00%
!align="right"|
!align="right"|
|- bgcolor="white"
!align="right" colspan=3|Total Rejected Ballots
!align="right"|109
!align="right"|%
!align="right"|
!align="right"|
|- bgcolor="white"
!align="right" colspan=3|Turnout
!align="right"|
!align="right"|%
!align="right"|
!align="right"|
|}

|-

 
|Co-operative Commonwealth Fed.
|Frank Howard
|align="right"|1,823 	
|align="right"|35.77%
|align="right"|
|align="right"|

|Liberal
|Paul Wilbur Hallman
|align="right"|1,387 			
|align="right"|27.22%
|align="right"|
|align="right"|
|- bgcolor="white"
!align="right" colspan=3|Total Valid Votes
!align="right"|5,096
!align="right"|100.00%
!align="right"|
!align="right"|
|- bgcolor="white"
!align="right" colspan=3|Total Rejected Ballots
!align="right"|132
!align="right"|%
!align="right"|
!align="right"|
|- bgcolor="white"
!align="right" colspan=3|Turnout
!align="right"|
!align="right"|%
!align="right"|
!align="right"|
|}

Total 	  	  		 

|-

|Co-operative Commonwealth Fed.
|Frank Howard 	 	 	
|align="right"|1,768 	 		
|align="right"|37.04% 
|align="right"|2,110
|align="right"|50.15%

|Liberal
|Lionel Charles Houle
|align="right"|1,413 	 	 	 	
|align="right"|29.60%
|align="right"|2,097
|align="right"|49.85%

|Progressive Conservative
|William John O'Neill
|align="right"|220 	 
|align="right"|4.61%
|align="right"|-
|align="right"|-% 
|- bgcolor="white"
!align="right" colspan=3|Total valid votes
!align="right"|4,773 	  	 	
!align="right"|100.00%
!align="right"|4,207 	
!align="right"|%
!align="right"|
|- bgcolor="white"
!align="right" colspan=3|Total rejected ballots
!align="right"|279
!align="right"|
!align="right"|
|- bgcolor="white"
!align="right" colspan=3|Total Registered Voters
!align="right"|5,933 (1952 list)
!align="right"|
!align="right"|
|- bgcolor="white"
!align="right" colspan=3|Turnout
!align="right"|70.15%
!align="right"|
!align="right"|
|- bgcolor="white"
!align="right" colspan=9|Preferential ballot; final count is between top two candidates from first count; intermediary counts (of 3) not shown
|}
	

|-

|Co-operative Commonwealth Fed.
|Joseph Daney Denicola
|align="right"|750 			
|align="right"|26.80%
|align="right"|
|align="right"|
|- bgcolor="white"
!align="right" colspan=3|Total Valid Votes
!align="right"|2,798
!align="right"|100.00%
!align="right"|
!align="right"|
|- bgcolor="white"
!align="right" colspan=3|Total Rejected Ballots
!align="right"|91
!align="right"|%
!align="right"|
!align="right"|
|- bgcolor="white"
!align="right" colspan=3|Turnout
!align="right"|
!align="right"|%
!align="right"|
!align="right"|
|}

|-

|Co-operative Commonwealth Fed.
|Floyd Forester Frank
|align="right"|634 			
|align="right"|41.30%
|align="right"|
|align="right"|
|- bgcolor="white"
!align="right" colspan=3|Total Valid Votes
!align="right"|1,535 
!align="right"|100.00%
!align="right"|
!align="right"|
|- bgcolor="white"
!align="right" colspan=3|Total Rejected Ballots
!align="right"|47
!align="right"|%
!align="right"|
!align="right"|
|- bgcolor="white"
!align="right" colspan=3|Turnout
!align="right"|
!align="right"|%
!align="right"|
!align="right"|
|}  	

|-

|Liberal
|Edward Tourtellotte Kenney
|align="right"|877 		
|align="right"|61.89%
|align="right"|
|align="right"|

|Progressive Conservative
|William John O'Neill
|align="right"|540 	 	
|align="right"|38.11%
|align="right"|
|align="right"|
|- bgcolor="white"
!align="right" colspan=3|Total Valid Votes
!align="right"|1,417 
!align="right"|100.00%
!align="right"|
!align="right"|
|- bgcolor="white"
!align="right" colspan=3|Total Rejected Ballots
!align="right"|61
!align="right"|%
!align="right"|
!align="right"|
|- bgcolor="white"
!align="right" colspan=3|Turnout
!align="right"|
!align="right"|%
!align="right"|
!align="right"|
|}  	

|-

|Liberal
|Edward Tourtellotte Kenney
|align="right"|1,006 			
|align="right"|59.74%
|align="right"|
|align="right"|

|Co-operative Commonwealth Fed.
|John Doney
|align="right"|678 	 	 	
|align="right"|40.26%
|align="right"|
|align="right"|
|- bgcolor="white"
!align="right" colspan=3|Total Valid Votes
!align="right"|1,684
!align="right"|100.00%
!align="right"|
!align="right"|
|- bgcolor="white"
!align="right" colspan=3|Total Rejected Ballots
!align="right"|68
!align="right"|%
!align="right"|
!align="right"|
|- bgcolor="white"
!align="right" colspan=3|Turnout
!align="right"|
!align="right"|%
!align="right"|
!align="right"|
|}  	

|-

|Liberal
|Edward Tourtellotte Kenney
|align="right"|902 				
|align="right"|56.34%
|align="right"|
|align="right"|

|Co-operative Commonwealth Fed.
|Joseph Edgar Panter
|align="right"|451 	 	 	 	
|align="right"|28.17%
|align="right"|
|align="right"|

|Independent
|Ralph Carmichael Bamford
|align="right"|248 				
|align="right"|15.49%
|align="right"|
|align="right"|
|- bgcolor="white"
!align="right" colspan=3|Total Valid Votes
!align="right"|1,601
!align="right"|100.00%
!align="right"|
!align="right"|
|- bgcolor="white"
!align="right" colspan=3|Total Rejected Ballots
!align="right"|49
!align="right"|%
!align="right"|
!align="right"|
|- bgcolor="white"
!align="right" colspan=3|Turnout
!align="right"|
!align="right"|%
!align="right"|
!align="right"|
|}  	

|-

|Liberal
|Horace Cooper Wrinch
|align="right"|910 	 				
|align="right"|54.33%
|align="right"|
|align="right"|

|Progressive Conservative
|Frank Maurice Dockrill
|align="right"|765 	 	 	 	 	
|align="right"|45.67%
|align="right"|
|align="right"|
|- bgcolor="white"
!align="right" colspan=3|Total Valid Votes
!align="right"|1,675
!align="right"|100.00%
!align="right"|
!align="right"|
|- bgcolor="white"
!align="right" colspan=3|Total Rejected Ballots
!align="right"|36
!align="right"|%
!align="right"|
!align="right"|
|- bgcolor="white"
!align="right" colspan=3|Turnout
!align="right"|
!align="right"|%
!align="right"|
!align="right"|
|}  	

|-

|Liberal
|Horace Cooper Wrinch
|align="right"|794 	 	 				
|align="right"|50.41%
|align="right"|
|align="right"|

|Conservative
|Richard Strong Sargent
|align="right"|246 					
|align="right"|15.62%
|align="right"|
|align="right"|
|- bgcolor="white"
!align="right" colspan=3|Total Valid Votes
!align="right"|1,575 
!align="right"|100.00%
!align="right"|
!align="right"|
|- bgcolor="white"
!align="right" colspan=3|Total Rejected Ballots
!align="right"|
!align="right"|%
!align="right"|
!align="right"|
|- bgcolor="white"
!align="right" colspan=3|Turnout
!align="right"|
!align="right"|%
!align="right"|
!align="right"|
|}

References

External links 
BC Stats Profile - 2001 (pdf)
Results of 2001 election (pdf)
2001 Expenditures
Results of 1996 election
1996 Expenditures
Results of 1991 election
1991 Expenditures
Website of the Legislative Assembly of British Columbia
Elections BC historical returns

British Columbia provincial electoral districts
Terrace, British Columbia